Beavertail Hill State Park is a public recreation area located on the Clark Fork River near Interstate 90,  east of Missoula, Montana. The amphitheatre hosts interpretive programs on Friday evenings in summer. Fishing, rafting, and swimming in the Clark Fork River are possible. About 26 camping sites are available for tents or RVs up to 26 feet long.

References

External links 
Beavertail Hill State Park Montana Fish, Wildlife & Parks
Beavertail Hill State Park Map Montana Fish, Wildlife & Parks

State parks of Montana
Protected areas of Missoula County, Montana
Protected areas established in 1968
1968 establishments in Montana